Admiral Robert Digby (20 December 1732 – 25 February 1815) was a Royal Navy officer who also served briefly as a Member of Parliament (MP). He is the namesake of Digby, Nova Scotia.

Naval career 
Digby was the third son of Charlotte Fox and the Hon. Edward Digby (1693–1746), eldest son of William Digby, 5th Baron Digby. He entered the navy aged twelve or thirteen, and became Captain of HMS Solebay at the age of 23 in 1755, rising to Second-in-Command of the Channel Fleet in 1779. He was appointed in 1781 as Admiral of the Red and given the command of the North American Station.

After the surrender of New York City in 1783, Digby helped to organise the evacuation of some 1,500 United Empire Loyalists to the small port of Conway in Nova Scotia. The settlement he led transformed the tiny village into a town, which in 1787 was renamed Digby. The town's museum was also named the Admiral Digby Museum in his honor.

He was recalled to home waters in 1787, was promoted to Admiral of the Blue, and retired from the navy in 1794.

Family 
His father died before inheriting the family's title, Baron Digby (in the peerage of Ireland), and on the death in 1752 of the 5th Baron, the title passed to the admiral's oldest brother Edward. When Edward died in 1757, the title was inherited by their brother Henry, and Robert was elected to succeed Edward as MP for Wells in Somerset, holding the seat from 1757 to 1761. (Because the family's title was in the peerage of Ireland, it did not confer a seat in the House of Lords, and did not disqualify the holder from election to the British House of Commons).

He married Eleanor Jauncey (née Elliot), daughter of Andrew Elliot, Lieutenant-Governor of New York. They had no children.

Notes

References

External links 

 List of Naval Battles – Robert Digby
Admiral Digby museum, in Digby, Nova Scotia

|-

1732 births
1815 deaths
Royal Navy admirals
Military history of Nova Scotia
Members of the Parliament of Great Britain for English constituencies
18th-century Royal Navy personnel
British MPs 1754–1761
Robert